The Canonicus-class monitor was a class of nine monitors built for the Union Navy during the American Civil War. They saw service in the Civil War and the Spanish–American War, although two of them were never commissioned.

They were basically improved s, modified in accordance with war experience. The four ships not commissioned during the war were built on the Ohio River, three at Cincinnati, and Manayunk as far up as South Pittsburgh.

Design
The hull lines were improved and designed speed is given as  but there was no hope of getting near this. The turret, of  internal diameter, had  plates as did the pilot house above, and the funnel base was also armored.

Tecumseh was sunk during the Battle of Mobile Bay by a mine. Canonicus, the last survivor, was decommissioned 31 years before being sold. Catawba and Oneota were both sold to Peru, on 2 April 1868, without ever entering service in the US Navy. Renamed by the Peruvian Navy as Atahualpa and Manco Capac respectively, they participated in the War of the Pacific, which lasted from 1879 to 1883.

Ships in class

See also 
 List of ironclads

Notes

References 
 
 
 
 
 
 
 
 
 

Monitor classes
 
Spanish–American War monitors of the United States